Kelvin Warren Fletcher (born 17 January 1984) is an English actor, model, racing driver and presenter. He played Andy Sugden in the ITV soap opera Emmerdale, a role he played from 1996 until 2016. In 2019, Fletcher won the seventeenth series of Strictly Come Dancing with his professional partner Oti Mabuse.

Early life
Fletcher attended Mayfield Primary School in Derker, Greater Manchester for his primary school education, and North Chadderton School, Chadderton for his secondary education.

Born the oldest of three boys, his youngest brother, Brayden Fletcher, also acts. At the age of six, Fletcher started attending drama classes at the Oldham Theatre Workshop and was first seen on television on a Saturday Disney report when he was starring as Charlie in Charlie Is My Darling, which he also performed in a special show at the London Palladium.

Career
Fletcher's television career began with appearances in In Suspicious Circumstances, Cracker, Heartbeat and Chiller. He also co-presented an episode of You've Been Framed with Jeremy Beadle. In 1996, Fletcher had a bit part in British soap opera, Coronation Street, before being selected to audition for Emmerdale for the role of tearaway Andy Hopwood, a schoolfriend of Robert Sugden. The character was originally scripted to appear in three episodes but was soon offered a longer contract, eventually appearing in 2,134 episodes over the course of 20 years, until he was written out of the soap in 2016. Fletcher went on to become one of the leading and most popular characters in the show, winning Best Actor and Best Dramatic Performance at the British Soap Awards.

Fletcher was once a National Champion in the minority sport inline hockey. He played for local Chadderton club 'Chaddy' Wildsharks. He was a national champion in 1998 when he and his team travelled to Newcastle and won the tournament over a weekend. Whilst playing for the 'Chaddy' Wildsharks, Fletcher gained many young fans who knew him from Emmerdale fame. They would turn out to watch him play, giving the 'Chaddy' Wildsharks junior team a larger than average audience.

On 8 September 2019, it was announced that Fletcher would be a competitor in the 2019 series of the BBC television competition, Strictly Come Dancing, as a replacement for reality TV star Jamie Laing, who had to withdraw from the show prior to airing due to a foot injury. He went on to reach the final and win the competition, resulting in his dance partner, Oti Mabuse, winning her first title on the show.

Since leaving Emmerdale, Fletcher has appeared in Death in Paradise and Moving On. In January 2022, he played the part of Jack in The Teacher alongside Sheridan Smith.

Motor racing career 
Fletcher first ventured into motor racing after a visit to a motoring show with his father in January 2012. He obtained an MSA Competition Licence and won the 2012 Silverstone Classic Celebrity Challenge race. Fletcher also competed in the Mighty Mini's and the Team Trophy. He was invited to partake in the Porsche Supercup support race of the 2014 British Grand Prix, where he finished 22nd.

Fletcher signed a contract to drive a Chevrolet Cruze entered by the Power Maxed Racing team in the 2016 British Touring Car Championship in March that year. He missed the Knockhill Racing Circuit and the Rockingham Motor Speedway rounds because his wife was due to give birth to their first child. Dave Newsham drove his car instead. During the season, Fletcher competed in 24 races spread over eight rounds of three events. He scored no points and was 31st in the final drivers' championship standings.

For the 2017 season, Fletcher moved to the British GT Championship and shared a Nissan 370Z Nismo with fellow driver Tim Eakin for the UltraTek Racing RJN in the GT4 category. He was mentored by FIA World Endurance Championship and 24 Hours of Le Mans class victor Martin Plowman during his rookie season. After three years of running in GT4 with Plowman, they will move up to the GT3 class in a Bentley Continental.

Personal life
Fletcher married fellow actor Elizabeth Marsland, whom he had known since the age of eight, in a secret ceremony on 28 November 2015. They have a daughter and a son and more recently twin boys.  Fletcher is also a fan of rugby league; growing up, he was a fan of Paul Sculthorpe and Kevin Sinfield as they were both from Oldham, and he makes occasional appearances at testimonial matches of famous players.

Filmography

Film

Television

Racing results

Complete Porsche Carrera Cup Great Britain results
(key) (Races in bold indicate pole position – 1 point awarded all races) (Races in italics indicate fastest lap – 1 point awarded all races)

Complete Porsche Supercup results

† As Fletcher was a guest driver, he was ineligible to score points.

Complete British Touring Car Championship results
(key) (Races in bold indicate pole position – 1 point awarded in first race) (Races in italics indicate fastest lap – 1 point awarded all races) (* signifies that driver lead race for at least one lap – 1 point awarded all races)

Complete British GT Championship results
(key) (Races in bold indicate pole position) (Races in italics indicate fastest lap)

References

External links
 

1984 births
Living people
English male child actors
English male soap opera actors
Male actors from Oldham
Strictly Come Dancing winners
People educated at North Chadderton School
British Touring Car Championship drivers
Porsche Carrera Cup GB drivers
British GT Championship drivers
20th-century English male actors
21st-century English male actors